Alex García (born December 2, 1961) is a retired Mexican-American boxer, who competed from 1987 to 2005 in the heavyweight division, best known for his short but nevertheless outstanding amateur career in 1986, and later to be a contender in the 1990s.

Early years
García grew up in San Fernando, California. First, he was a pitcher and shortstop playing in kid leagues. Then, he was an all-league middle linebacker at San Fernando High School. Later he became a gang member, and eventually served five years in California state prisons at Soledad, San Quentin and Chino, for involuntary manslaughter after stabbing a rival gang member. Upon his release, he found himself training at the Jet Center, where he took up boxing. He was mentored under former middleweight William  “Blinky” Rodriguez at the Benny's Jet Center martial arts and boxing complex in Van Nuys, California. "For two years, since he got out of prison, he's been working hard six days a week ... showing desire and discipline," Rodriguez said on his trainee. "He's got 200 street fights. If a guy goes after you with a bumper jack, you better be elusive," said Rodriguez.

Amateur career
García rapidly began dispatching his foes at the amateurs. He won the Southern California Golden Gloves title and went on to win the National AAU Championships Super Heavyweight title in Beaumont in April 1986. "It was my best fight," said Garcia in the understatement of the tournament. Longtime amateur boxing people called Garcia's performance a surprise. William Pendleton of the U.S. Amateur Boxing Federation board of governors said of his performance at the nationals: "Here was a guy who came in totally from the cold and won the gold medal." He lost a close decision to Wesley Watson prior to the nationals, but avenged that defeat when he stopped Watson in two rounds to earn a spot on the U.S. team for the 1986 World Championships. He was training for the world championships in a parking garage converted into a boxing gym at the Sands Regency Hotel in Reno. at the world championships he defeated all his opponents on to his way to the finals, to losing the final to Teófilo Stevenson, winning the silver. Stevenson, a veteran of international boxing, age 35, with a 20-year-long career, won for the 301st time, knocking down Garcia, whose amateur record stood 17–2.  "Winning by a knockout is just like a baseball player hitting a home run," said Stevenson after he knocked out García. "I want to fight him again. I want to redeem myself," said García after his defeat in the hands of Stevenson. García claimed he never lost in hundreds of street fights. "I always wanted to box, but I just never took the time to go into the gym and train; I was having too much fun on the streets," he said to the press. "There are some things you can't coach. He's got natural athletic ability. He's got durability, heart, power and he's come along real fast. When we went to the world championships, a lot of guys came up to me and asked me how many fights he'd really had. They couldn't believe he'd only fought 18 times and he was fighting for the gold medal in the world championships with that few fights," said his coach Rodriguez. García has been invited to work out at the U.S. Olympic Training Center. García also sparred with Mike Weaver, the former World Boxing Association heavyweight champion. García said he was a little wary when he first got into the ring against Weaver. Instead of boxing in the 1986 Goodwill Games, García chose to rest. He soon fought at the 1986 USA−USSR boxing duals, where he fought Vyacheslav Yakovlev (who also lost to Stevenson at Reno by majority decision,) in a match-up on July 26, and exhibition bout on August 2, losing him twice in a row, both time by unanimous decision. "I told myself I was going to become a fighter, going to stick with it. It was a big adjustment getting out (of prison). You get institutionalized, get out of the habits of normal life. Although I wanted to be a boxer, I never thought I'd come this far this fast," said García on his progress.

Highlights

 Southern California Golden Gloves (+201 lbs), Los Angeles, California, 1986:
 (no data available)
Local match-up (+201 lbs), 1986:
Lost to Wesley Watson by split decision, 2–3
 National Championships (+201 lbs), Civic Center, Beaumont, Texas, April 1986:
1/2: Defeated Kimmuel Odum by unanimous decision, 5−0
Finals: Defeated Wesley Watson by majority decision, 4−1 
World Champ Box-offs (+201 lbs), Caesars Tahoe, Lake Tahoe, Nevada, April 1986:
Finals (Qualified): Defeated Wesley Watson RSC 2 

 World Championships (+201 lbs), Sparks Convention Center, Reno, Nevada, May 1986:
1/8: Defeated Baik Hyun-man (South Korea) RSCH 2
1/4: Defeated Aziz Salihu (Yugoslavia) RSCH 2 
1/2: Defeated Biaggio Chianese (Italy) RSCH 2 
Finals: Lost to Teófilo Stevenson (Cuba) RSCH 2 
USA−USSR Middle & Heavy Duals (+201 lbs), ARCO Arena, Sacramento, California, July 1986:
Lost to Vyacheslav Yakovlev (Soviet Union) by unanimous decision, 0−5
USA−USSR Exhibition (+201 lbs), Houston, Texas, August 1986:
Lost to Vyacheslav Yakovlev (Soviet Union) by unanimous decision, 0−3

1988 Olympics
He wasn't sure whether he would wait until after the 1988 Summer Olympics in Seoul, South Korea, because, once he wanted to turn pro immediately. This accounted for a brief hiatus, and finally, having 21 amateur fights under his belt, with a record of 17 wins (13 by knockout,) and 4 losses, García turned pro.

Professional career
He started his pro career in California in 1987 and, apart from a cut stoppage loss against Dee Collier, dominated his opposition on his way to contention.  Notable opponents at beaten by García at this stage of his career included Eddie Gonzalez, Rocky Sekorski, and Jerry Goff.

In 1992 he won the NABF title against Jerry Jones.  After three successful defenses, and with a fight against Riddick Bowe in the advanced planning stage, he took a warm-up fight against Mike Dixon who KOd him by catching García with a blow to his temple. However, soon after in a rematch fight at the "Brady Theater" in Tulsa, OK in May 1994, Alex García won a unanimous decision against Mike Dixon.  García never was a serious contender again, drawing with James Warring and getting KOd by Garing Lane.

In 1994 he lost his NABF title on points to fringe contender Joe Hipp, in 1995 he lost on points to Buster Mathis Jr.

Professional boxing record

|-
|align="center" colspan=8|40 Wins (29 knockouts, 11 decisions), 6 Losses (4 knockouts, 2 decisions), 1 Draw
|-
| align="center" style="border-style: none none solid solid; background: #e3e3e3"|Result
| align="center" style="border-style: none none solid solid; background: #e3e3e3"|Record
| align="center" style="border-style: none none solid solid; background: #e3e3e3"|Opponent
| align="center" style="border-style: none none solid solid; background: #e3e3e3"|Type
| align="center" style="border-style: none none solid solid; background: #e3e3e3"|Round
| align="center" style="border-style: none none solid solid; background: #e3e3e3"|Date
| align="center" style="border-style: none none solid solid; background: #e3e3e3"|Location
| align="center" style="border-style: none none solid solid; background: #e3e3e3"|Notes
|-
|Loss
|
|align=left| Wallace McDaniel
|KO
|3
|05/04/2005
|align=left| Memphis, Tennessee, U.S.
|align=left|
|-
|Win
|
|align=left| Ron McCarthy
|MD
|8
|07/12/1999
|align=left| Yonkers, New York, U.S.
|align=left|
|-
|Win
|
|align=left| George Harris
|TKO
|1
|07/08/1999
|align=left| Camden, South Carolina, U.S.
|align=left|
|-
|Win
|
|align=left| Martin Lopez
|TKO
|2
|29/08/1997
|align=left| El Paso, Texas, U.S.
|align=left|
|-
|Loss
|
|align=left| Buster Mathis, Jr.
|UD
|12
|18/04/1995
|align=left| Las Vegas, Nevada, U.S.
|align=left|
|-
|Win
|
|align=left| George Stephens
|TKO
|3
|18/11/1994
|align=left| Albuquerque, New Mexico, U.S.
|align=left|
|-
|Win
|
|align=left| Ed Donaldson
|UD
|10
|01/09/1994
|align=left| Albuquerque, New Mexico, U.S.
|align=left|
|-
|Win
|
|align=left| Mike Dixon
|UD
|10
|24/05/1994
|align=left| Tulsa, Oklahoma, U.S.
|align=left|
|-
|Loss
|
|align=left| Joe Hipp
|UD
|12
|01/03/1994
|align=left| Atlantic City, New Jersey, U.S.
|align=left|
|-
|Win
|
|align=left| George O'Mara
|PTS
|10
|20/01/1994
|align=left| Irvine, California, U.S.
|align=left|
|-
|Win
|
|align=left| Everton Davis
|PTS
|10
|18/12/1993
|align=left| Las Vegas, Nevada, U.S.
|align=left|
|-
|Loss
|
|align=left| Garing Lane
|TKO
|2
|20/08/1993
|align=left| Fort Lauderdale, Florida, U.S.
|align=left|
|-
| Draw
|
|align=left| James Warring
|SD
|12
|27/07/1993
|align=left| Las Vegas, Nevada, U.S.
|align=left|
|-
|Loss
|
|align=left| Mike Dixon
|TKO
|2
|08/06/1993
|align=left| Las Vegas, Nevada, U.S.
|align=left|
|-
|Win
|
|align=left| Eric Curry
|TKO
|12
|20/04/1993
|align=left| Las Vegas, Nevada, U.S.
|align=left|
|-
|Win
|
|align=left| West Turner
|TKO
|1
|27/03/1993
|align=left| Las Vegas, Nevada, U.S.
|align=left|
|-
|Win
|
|align=left| Mike Williams
|TKO
|5
|16/02/1993
|align=left| Denver, Colorado, U.S.
|align=left|
|-
|Win
|
|align=left| Jerry Jones
|UD
|12
|08/12/1992
|align=left| Tampa, Florida, U.S.
|align=left|
|-
|Win
|
|align=left| Ossie Ocasio
|TKO
|8
|23/11/1992
|align=left| Inglewood, California, U.S.
|align=left|
|-
|Win
|
|align=left| Matthew Brooks
|TKO
|2
|27/10/1992
|align=left| Houston, Texas, U.S.
|align=left|
|-
|Win
|
|align=left| Mike White
|TKO
|2
|22/09/1992
|align=left| El Paso, Texas, U.S.
|align=left|
|-
|Win
|
|align=left| Arthur Weathers
|KO
|2
|10/08/1992
|align=left| Inglewood, California, U.S.
|align=left|
|-
|Win
|
|align=left| Mike Ronay Evans
|UD
|10
|02/07/1992
|align=left| Reno, Nevada, U.S.
|align=left|
|-
|Win
|
|align=left| Mike Gans
|KO
|2
|27/05/1992
|align=left| San Diego, California, U.S.
|align=left|
|-
|Win
|
|align=left| Bobby Crabtree
|KO
|6
|04/03/1992
|align=left| Bakersfield, California, U.S.
|align=left|
|-
|Win
|
|align=left| Jerry Goff
|TKO
|2
|11/07/1991
|align=left| Gardnerville, Nevada, U.S.
|align=left|
|-
|Win
|
|align=left| Rocky Sekorski
|KO
|1
|23/05/1991
|align=left| Las Vegas, Nevada, U.S.
|align=left|
|-
|Win
|
|align=left| Ladislao Mijangos
|TKO
|3
|22/03/1991
|align=left| Lake Tahoe, Nevada, U.S.
|align=left|
|-
|Win
|
|align=left| Bernard Benton
|TKO
|2
|09/10/1990
|align=left| Phoenix, Arizona, U.S.
|align=left|
|-
|Win
|
|align=left| Bill Duncan
|TKO
|1
|07/05/1990
|align=left| Inglewood, California, U.S.
|align=left|
|-
|Win
|
|align=left| Dion Burgess
|TKO
|4
|27/03/1990
|align=left| Reseda, California, U.S.
|align=left|
|-
|Win
|
|align=left| Andre McCall
|TKO
|2
|08/01/1990
|align=left| Inglewood, California, U.S.
|align=left|
|-
|Win
|
|align=left| Jim Ashard
|KO
|4
|13/11/1989
|align=left| Inglewood, California, U.S.
|align=left|
|-
|Win
|
|align=left| Eddie Gonzales
|UD
|10
|24/10/1989
|align=left| Reseda, California, U.S.
|align=left|
|-
|Win
|
|align=left| Eddie Richardson
|KO
|7
|29/08/1989
|align=left| Reseda, California, U.S.
|align=left|
|-
|Loss
|
|align=left| Dee Collier
|TKO
|8
|29/11/1988
|align=left| Reseda, California, U.S.
|align=left|
|-
|Win
|
|align=left| Veti Katoa
|KO
|1
|29/07/1988
|align=left| Redondo Beach, California, U.S.
|align=left|
|-
|Win
|10–0
|align=left| Jack S. Jackson
|KO
|2
|23/06/1988
|align=left| Los Angeles, California, U.S.
|align=left|
|-
|Win
|9–0
|align=left| Rodney Stockton
|KO
|2
|27/05/1988
|align=left| Redondo Beach, California, U.S.
|align=left|
|-
|Win
|8–0
|align=left| Dennis Fikes
|KO
|3
|24/03/1988
|align=left| Los Angeles, California, U.S.
|align=left|
|-
|Win
|7–0
|align=left| Dave Slaughter
|KO
|2
|12/11/1987
|align=left| Los Angeles, California, U.S.
|align=left|
|-
|Win
|6–0
|align=left| Dwain Bonds
|UD
|6
|29/08/1987
|align=left| Los Angeles, California, U.S.
|align=left|
|-
|Win
|5–0
|align=left| Andre Smith
|UD
|5
|09/07/1987
|align=left| Los Angeles, California, U.S.
|align=left|
|-
|Win
|4–0
|align=left| William Campudani
|KO
|1
|18/06/1987
|align=left| Los Angeles, California, U.S.
|align=left|
|-
|Win
|3–0
|align=left| Tony Crawford
|KO
|1
|28/05/1987
|align=left| Los Angeles, California, U.S.
|align=left|
|-
|Win
|2–0
|align=left| Richard Harrell
|UD
|4
|24/02/1987
|align=left| Reseda, California, U.S.
|align=left|
|-
|Win
|1–0
|align=left| Cliff Melbourne
|KO
|1
|06/02/1987
|align=left| Reseda, California, U.S.
|align=left|
|}

References

External links
 

Living people
1961 births
Heavyweight boxers
American boxers of Mexican descent
American people convicted of manslaughter
American sportspeople convicted of crimes
National Golden Gloves champions
Former gang members
American male boxers
AIBA World Boxing Championships medalists